(William) Stuart Harris, DD, KHC  (1849- 1923) was a Church of England priest and  Royal Navy chaplain. He was the Chaplain of the Fleet and Archdeacon of the Royal Navy, serving from 1901 to 1906.

Berry was educated at Trinity College, Cambridge and ordained in 1876. He began his ecclesiastical career with  curacies at New Shildon and Staindrop. He served with the Navy from 1879 to 1906, and was Chaplain of the Fleet from 1901 until his retirement. An Order in Council issued by King Edward VII in August 1902 granted the ecclesiastical dignity of archdeacon on the Chaplain of the Fleet, and Harris was instituted as such by the Archbishop of Canterbury in Lambeth Palace Chapel on 23 October 1902. He was an Honorary Chaplain to the King from 1910 to 1926. He died on 23 May 1935.

Footnotes

1849 births
1935 deaths
19th-century English Anglican priests
20th-century English Anglican priests
Chaplains of the Fleet
Alumni of Trinity College, Cambridge
Honorary Chaplains to the King